Oleg Yem (born 26 January 1974) is a Kazakhstani weightlifter. He competed in the men's featherweight event at the 1996 Summer Olympics.

References

1974 births
Living people
Kazakhstani male weightlifters
Olympic weightlifters of Kazakhstan
Weightlifters at the 1996 Summer Olympics
Place of birth missing (living people)
20th-century Kazakhstani people